Bushmaster bullpup may refer to:

 Bushmaster M17S, a bullpup rifle
 Bushmaster Arm Pistol, a bullpup pistol